Kolporter sp. z o.o. is a Polish company. It was established in the 1990s by Krzysztof Klicki and has its headquarters in Kielce. It has made the Top 500 Polish Companies rankings in Polityka and Rzeczpospolita several times.

Its name comes from its initial business, the distribution of newspapers and magazines. The name Kolporter means "distributor" in Polish. Now there are over a dozen companies in many sectors of the Polish market that are part of the Kolporter.

Sponsorship
Kolporter was a sponsor of Korona Kielce football team.

References

Companies of Poland
Polish brands
Korona Kielce